Men at Work are an Australian rock band.

Men at Work may also refer to:

 Men at Work (1990 film), a 1990 American action comedy
 Men at Work (2006 film), a 2006 Iranian film
 Men at Work: Miami, a 2020 Dutch film
 Men at Work (TV series), a 2012 American sitcom
 Men at Work: The Craft of Baseball, a 1990 book by George Will
 Men at Work!, a 1999 eroge video game produced by Studio e.go!
 "Men at Work", a 1989 song by Kool G Rap & DJ Polo from Road to the Riches
 "Men at Work", a short story by Graham Greene in his collection Twenty-One Stories

See also 
 Aan: Men at Work, a 2004 Bollywood film
 Man @ Work, a 2003 album by Colin Hay